Jangipara is a village in Jangipara CD Block in Srirampore subdivision of Hooghly district in the Indian state of West Bengal.

Geography

Location

Police station
Jangipara police station has jurisdiction over the Jangipara CD Block.

CD Block HQ
The headquarters of Jangipara CD Block are located at Jangipara.

Urbanisation

Srirampore subdivision is the most urbanized of the subdivisions in Hooghly district. 73.13% of the population in the subdivision is urban and 26.88% is rural. The subdivision has 6 municipalities and 34 census towns. The municipalities are: Uttarpara Kotrung Municipality, Konnagar Municipality, Serampore Municipality, Baidyabati Municipality, Rishra Municipality and Dankuni Municipality. Amongst the CD Blocks in the subdivision, Uttarapara Serampore (census towns shown in a separate map) had 76% urban population, Chanditala I 42%, Chanditala II 69% and Jangipara 7% (census towns shown in the map above). All places marked in the map are linked in the larger full screen map.

Demographics
As per 2011 Census of India Jangipara had a total population of 2,700 of which 1,343 (50%) were males and 1,357 (50%) were females. Population below 6 years was 241. The total number of literates in Jangipara was 2,019 (82.11% of the population over 6 years).

Education
Mahitosh Nandy Mahavidyalaya, a general degree college, was established at Jangipara, in 2007. It offers honours courses in Bengali, Arabic, English, Sanskrit, history, philosophy and education.

Jangipara D.N. High School is a coeducational higher secondary school at Jangipara. It has arrangements for teaching Bengali, English, Sanskrit, history, philosophy, political science, economics, eco-geography, accountancy, business economics & mathematics. Bibhutibhushan Bandopadhyay Once Served Here As A Teacher. 

Jangipara Balika Vidyalaya is a girls only higher secondary school. It has arrangements for teaching Bengali, English, Sanskrit, history, philosophy, political science and education.

Healthcare
Jangipara Rural Hospital functions with 60 beds.

Transport

Bus

Private Bus
 9 Haripal railway station - Udaynarayanpur
 9A Haripal railway station - Bargachia 
 31 Jangipara - Serampore
 CTC

Bus Route Without Number
 Rajbalhat - Howrah Station 
 Tarakeswar - Bargachia
 Jangipara - Chunchura Court 
 Dharmatala To Jangipara And Antpur CTC

Train
Bargachia railway station and Haripal railway station are the nearest railway stations of Jangipara.

References

Villages in Hooghly district